Hawthorne & 8th is a streetcar station in Charlotte, North Carolina. The at-grade island platform on Hawthorne Lane is a stop along the CityLynx Gold Line, serving the Elizabeth neighborhood.

Location 
Hawthorne & 8th station is located at the intersection of Hawthorne Lane and 8th Street, in Elizabeth. The immediate area is a mix of single-family homes and multifamily residential. One block southwest is Independence Park and various shops and businesses along 7th Street.

History 
Hawthorne & 8th station was approved as a Gold Line Phase 2 stop in 2013, with construction beginning in Fall 2016. Though it was slated to open in early-2020, various delays pushed out the opening till mid-2021. The station opened to the public on August 30, 2021.

Station layout 
The station consists of an island platform with two passenger shelters; a crosswalk and ramp provide platform access from Hawthorne Lane. The station's passenger shelters house two art installations by Taiwanese–American artist Amy Cheng. Each World Within Worlds panel features a lace-like pattern etched into the glass. They are deliberately more abstract than works of art at other Gold Line stations and are meant to evoke the quieter aspects of the Elizabeth residential neighborhood.

References

External links
 

Lynx Gold Line stations
Railway stations in the United States opened in 2021
2021 establishments in North Carolina